Uchaly Mining and Metallurgical Combine  (UMMC or UGOK) is a Russian metallurgical combine based in Uchaly, Bashkortostan.  In 2016, UMMC incorporated Chelyabinsk Zinc Plant (CZP) and became the largest producer of zinc concentrate in Russia.

Gallery

References

External links 
Company website
Bashkir enciklopedy web-site(in Bashkir)
Махмудов Искандар. Президент Уральской горно-металлургической компании — «lenta.ru» сайты
Башҡортостан Республикаһы Башлығы. Рәсми сайт(in Bashkir)

Mining companies of Russia
Companies based in Bashkortostan
Ural Mining and Metallurgical Company
Mining companies of the Soviet Union